The 295th Infantry Regiment was a light infantry regiment of the Puerto Rico Army National Guard consisting mostly of Puerto Rican enlisted soldiers and officers. The regiment was the first regiment of any kind assigned to the Puerto Rico National Guard back when it was known locally as the 1st Infantry Regiment.

History
The 295th traces its history back to the Spanish colonization of the Americas as an infantry militia constituted on May 17, 1762, as part of the reorganization of the Milicias Disciplinadas decreed by Spain. However, on February 12, 1870, the militia were reduced to en cadre until their disbandment in April 1898 after Puerto Rico was ceded to the United States.

Almost two decades after, on 1917 and at the brink of World War I, Puerto Ricans were granted American citizenship. Right after, the President of the Senate of Puerto Rico requested the United States Army to include Puerto Ricans on the draft. At the time, the United States Army was segregated, and, in order to assign more than 18,000 Puerto Ricans that enlisted or were drafted into the Army for the war effort, the Army created an infantry regiment and the Puerto Rico Voluntary Infantry. The regiment was merely a reconstitution of the disbanded Spanish-era militia as an infantry regiment assigned to the Puerto Rico National Guard on April 12, 1917. Two years later, this freshly created regiment was designated as the 1st Infantry Regiment on July 19, 1919. Several years later, somewhen between July 9 and September 13 of 1922, the Puerto Rico National Guard established a new battalion and called it the 1st Battalion, 2nd Infantry Regiment. A few months later, the battalion was renamed as the 1st Battalion, 296th Infantry Regiment (1-296) on December 26, 1922. A few weeks later, on January 23, 1923, the aforementioned 1st Infantry Regiment was renamed as the 295th Infantry Regiment. This series of events would establish a long parallel history between the 295th and the 296th infantry regiments.

On June 1, 1936, a set of confusing changes takes place. First, the 1st Battalion of the 295th Infantry Regiment (1-295) is split into two battalions in order to form the 1st Battalion and 2nd Battalion of the 295th Infantry Regiment (1-295 & 2-295). However, these two battalions (1-295 & 2-295) become the 1st Battalion and 2nd Battalion of the 296th Infantry Regiment (1-296 & 2-296) while simultaneously the pre-existing 1st Battalion of the 296th (1-296) becomes the 1st Battalion of the 295th Infantry Regiment (1-295).

A few months after the break out of World War II, between 18–25 June 1940 the regiment organizes its 3rd Battalion (3-295). Several weeks after, on August 25, 1940, the regiment becomes part of a new unit: the 92nd Infantry Brigade. A few years later, on January 1, 1944, the regiment was activated and served in the American Theater of war in the Panama Canal Zone until February 20, 1946.

The regiment then suffered a series of mobilizations, inactivations, and reorganizations that ultimately dissolved it as a regiment on May 1, 1964. The regiment was simply reorganized as two battalions of the 92nd Infantry Brigade on that date although they maintained their names without an administrative hierarchy as a regiment. Finally, on December 31, 1967, the battalions were reorganized as a single battalion of the 92nd Infantry Brigade. The battalion, however, was eventually allocated to the 101st Troop Command.

Most recently, Company C, 1st Battalion, 295th Infantry Regiment (C/1-295) spent a year running security escort missions throughout southern Iraq and security patrols around Baghdad International Airport as part of Operation Iraqi Freedom in 2006.

Structure
 Executive branch of the government of Puerto Rico & National Guard Bureau & United States Department of the Army
 Puerto Rico National Guard & Army National Guard
 Puerto Rico Army National Guard
 101st Troop Command
 1st Battalion, 295th Infantry Regiment

Honors and awards

See also
 Military history of Puerto Rico

Notes

References

Military units and formations in Puerto Rico
Puerto Rico Army National Guard